Musical Chairs is the third studio album by American rock band Hootie & the Blowfish, released on September 15, 1998, by Atlantic Records. Three singles were released off the album: "I Will Wait", "Only Lonely", and "Wishing". Guest musicians on the album include Peter Holsapple, Susan Cowsill, David Immergluck, and Boyd Tinsley.

Track listing
All songs written by Mark Bryan, Dean Felber, Darius Rucker and Jim Sonefeld.
"I Will Wait" – 4:15
"Wishing" – 2:48
"Las Vegas Nights" – 4:05
"Only Lonely" – 4:38
"Answer Man" – 3:22
"Michelle Post" – 2:20
"Bluesy Revolution" – 4:46
"Home Again" – 4:07
"One By One" – 3:50
"Desert Mountain Showdown" – 2:45
"What's Going On Here" – 4:36
"What Do You Want from Me Now" – 3:40
Hidden tracks
silence – 0:30
silence – 0:30
"Closet Full of Fear" – 3:18

Personnel
Hootie & the Blowfish
 Mark Bryan – guitars, background vocals, banjo 
 Dean Felber - bass guitar, background vocals, acoustic guitar 
 Darius Rucker – vocals, guitars, mandolin 
 Jim Sonefeld – drums, percussion, background vocals, bass guitar 

Additional musicians
 John Nau – Hammond organ, piano, harmonica , Vox Jaguar , Wurlitzer 

 Robert Becker – viola 
 David Campbell – string arrangement 
 Larry Corbett – cello 
 Susan Cowsill – vocals 
 Joel Derouin – violin 
 Bruce Dukov – violin 
 Armen Gahabedian – violin 
 Gary Greene – percussion 
 Peter Holsapple – accordion , Dobro , electric guitar , mandolin , piano 
 David Immerglück – electric slide guitar , pedal steel 
 Suzie Katayama – cello 
 LeRoi Moore – soprano and alto sax 
 Rachel Purkin – violin 
 Gena Rankin – vocals 
 Boyd Tinsley – violin 
 Patrick Warren – Chamberlin 

Production
 Don Gehman – producer, engineer, co-mixing
 Doug Trantow – engineer, co-mixing
 Curt Kroeger – assistant engineer
 Roger Sommers – assistant engineer
 David Leonard – mixing
 Joe Gastwirt – mastering

Chart positions

References

1998 albums
Albums produced by Don Gehman
Atlantic Records albums
Hootie & the Blowfish albums